Poghossian, Pogossyan,  Poghosyan, Poghosian, Pogosyan, etc., is an Armenian surname. Also Ter-Pogossian, Der-Pogossian, and variants. Ter/Der indicates priesthood descent. The Western Armenian equivalent is Boghossyan. It is a patronymic from the first name Poghos (Armenian: Պողոս), equivalent to Paul, making the name effectively equivalent to Paulson. It may refer to:

 Armen Poghosyan, conductor of "Sofia" Russian private orchestra
 Armen Poghosyan (military musician), Armenian military musician
 David Pogosian, Olympic wrestler
 Gevorik Poghosyan, Armenian weightlifter
 Gilbert Pogosyan, American soccer player
 Hasmik Poghosyan, Minister of Culture of Armenia
 Manvel Ter-Pogosyan, a.k.a. Amurai, American trance music producer
 Metakse Poghosian, Armenian poet
 Michael Poghosyan,  Armenian film and theatre actor and judge on the Armenian version of Pop Idol
 Mihran Poghosyan, Armenian businessman
 Mikhail Pogosyan, Russian aerospace engineer
 Ann Ter-Pogossian, American artist
 Michel Ter-Pogossian, American physicist
 Poghos Poghosyan, killed by President Kocharyan's bodyguards
 Stefan Pogosyan, Russian chess master
 Stepan Karapetovich Pogosyan
 Yura Poghosyan, a National Hero of Armenia
 Genrikh Poghosyan, Soviet party leader of the Nagorno-Karabakh Autonomous Oblast
 Zhirayr Poghosyan, Prime Minister of Nagorno-Karabakh

Armenian-language surnames
Patronymic surnames
Surnames from given names